Dąbal (plural: Dąbalowie) is a Polish-language surname. Dąbal surname is derived from the word dąb, meaning "oak". Notable people with the surname include:

 Franciszek Dąbal (1920–1989), Polish politician
 Michał Dąbal (born 1985), Polish music producer
 Tomasz Dąbal (1890–1937), Polish politician
 Wit Dąbal (born 1955), Polish cinematographer

Bartłomiej Topa played the fictional character of Krzysztof Dąbal in the film Wyjazd integracyjny.

See also
 
 Dabal
 Dąbale

References

Polish-language surnames